In the run-up to the 2019 Danish general election on 5 June 2019, various organisations carry out opinion polling to gauge voting intentions. Results of such polls are displayed in this article.

The date range for these opinion polls are from the previous parliamentary election, held on 18 June 2015, to the present day. The next general election was scheduled to be held on or before 17 June 2019, but on 7 May 2019 Prime Minister Lars Løkke Rasmussen announced that it will take place on 5 June 2019.

Graphical summary

Blocs

Parties

Poll results

Poll results are listed in the tables below in reverse chronological order, showing the most recent first, and using the date the survey's fieldwork was completed as opposed to the date of publication. If such date is unknown, the date of publication is given instead. The highest percentage figure in each polling survey is displayed in bold, and the background shaded in the leading party's colour. In the instance that there is a tie between multiple parties, then the leading parties are shaded. The lead column on the right shows the percentage-point difference between the two parties with the highest figures. When a specific poll does not show a data figure for a party, the party's cell corresponding to that poll is shown empty.

2019

2018

2017

2016

2015

Faroe Islands

Greenland

See also 
Opinion polling for the next Danish general election
Opinion polling for the 2015 Danish general election

Notes

2019
2019
2019